WAID (106.5 FM) is a radio station broadcasting an urban contemporary format.  Licensed to Clarksdale, Mississippi, United States, the station, also known as "Power 106.5," is currently owned by Radio Cleveland and features programming from Compass Media Networks . The station broadcasts the nationally syndicated Tom Joyner Morning Show and Doug Banks show.

References

External links
Radio Cleveland Facebook

AID
Urban contemporary radio stations in the United States